William Calder may refer to:

Politicians
William M. Calder, American politician 
William Henderson Calder, New Zealand politician
William Calder (1767–1829), Lord Provost of Edinburgh 1810-11

Others
William Calder (footballer), Scottish footballer
William Calder (engineer)
William Calder, of the Calder baronets

See also
Calder (disambiguation)